From January 8, 1957, through August 1960 the NWA Minneapolis Wrestling and Boxing Club promoted the Minneapolis version of the NWA World Tag Team Championship as the main professional wrestling championship for tag teams on their shows held in and around Minneapolis. The Minneapolis Wrestling and Boxing Club was a member of the National Wrestling Alliance (NWA) from its formation in 1948, but left the group in 1960 to help form the American Wrestling Association (AWA). The NWA Board of Directors allowed each member, referred to as a NWA territory, to create and control its own individual "NWA World Tag Team Championship" to be defended within its territory. At one point in 1957, no less than 13 different versions of the NWA World Tag Team Championship were recognized across the United States. As with all professional wrestling championships, this championship was not contested for in competitive matches, but in matches with predetermined outcomes to maintain the illusion that professional wrestling is a competitive sport.

Records indicate that brothers Al and Tiny Mills were recognized as NWA World Tag Team Champions in Minnesota in June 1953, as they lost the championship to Tony Baillargeon and Pat O'Connor on June 20, 1953. The records did not indicate how the Mills brothers won the championship, nor is it clear what happened after Baillargeon and O'Connor won the championship. Records of an active NWA World Tag Team Championship in the Minneapolis area do not indicate new champions until January 8, 1957, when The Kalmikoffs (Ivan and Karol Kalmikoff) defeated Fritz Von Erich and Karl Von Schober in the finals of a tournament to win the championship. In 1960 the Minneapolis promotion left the NWA to found the AWA, which meant that the last holders of the NWA championship, Murder Inc. (Stan Kowalski and Tiny Mills), became the first AWA World Tag Team Champions as all NWA-branded championships were abandoned.

The Kalmikoffs held the championship a total of four times, the record both for teams and for Ivan and Karol Kalmikoffs as individuals. Verne Gagne shares the record of four championship reigns, with three different partners: Leo Nomellini, Bronko Nagurski, and Butch Levy. Due to lack of details surrounding various championship changes, it is uncertain which team had the shortest reign; Herb and Seymore Freeman's reign of seven days is the shortest confirmed reign, but the possibility exists that another team had a shorter reign. The last reign was also the longest reign, as Murder Inc. held the championship for 193 days before being awarded the AWA World Tag Team Championship.

Title history

Team reigns by combined length
Key

Individual reigns by combined length
Key

Footnotes

Concurrent championships
Sources for 13 simultaneous NWA World Tag Team Championships
 NWA World Tag Team Championship (Los Angeles version)
 NWA World Tag Team Championship (San Francisco version)
 NWA World Tag Team Championship (Central States version)
 NWA World Tag Team Championship (Chicago version)
 NWA World Tag Team Championship (Buffalo Athletic Club version)
 NWA World Tag Team Championship (Georgia version)
 NWA World Tag Team Championship (Iowa/Nebraska version)
 NWA World Tag Team Championship (Indianapolis version)
 NWA World Tag Team Championship (Salt Lake Wrestling Club version)
 NWA World Tag Team Championship (Amarillo version)
 NWA World Tag Team Championship (Minneapolis version)
 NWA World Tag Team Championship (Texas version)
 NWA World Tag Team Championship (Mid-America version)

References

Tag team wrestling championships
National Wrestling Alliance championships
American Wrestling Association championships
Professional wrestling in Minneapolis
World professional wrestling championships